Joskeleigh is a coastal rural locality in the Livingstone Shire, Queensland, Australia.

Geography 
The waters of the Coral Sea form the eastern boundary.

History 

Joskeleigh Provisional School opened on 28 October 1913 in a church building, pending the erection of a school building, under head teacher Frederick Vespermann. There was an average of 21 students in 1913. In 1918 it became Joskeleigh State School. It closed on 29 April 1985 due to falling enrolments. It was at 356 Joskeleigh Road.

Sandhills Post Office opened on 24 December 1923 (a receiving office had been open from 1898, named Fishergate until 1908) and closed in 1937.

Joskeleigh Post Office opened on 1 September 1947 and closed in 1971.

Between 2008 and 2013, the locality was within the Rockhampton Region.

Heritage listings
Joskeleigh has a number of heritage-listed sites, including:
 Joskeleigh Cemetery: Joskeleigh Road

References

External links

 
 Joskeleigh : a place to call home - digital story produced by State Library of Queensland

Towns in Queensland
Shire of Livingstone
Capricorn Coast
Localities in Queensland